Sinhgad Public School is a senior secondary school located in Lonavala. It offers schooling from Nursery to Class 12. The school comes under the Sinhgad Technical Education Society group of institutes. Sinhgad Public School, Lonavala is affiliated with the Central Board of Secondary Education, New Delhi.

References 

Schools in Maharashtra